The H.C. Andersen Marathon (HCA Marathon) is a marathon in Odense, Denmark, which was established in 2000. From 2006 onwards, the event has included a half marathon and from 2017 a 10K race "Run the last 10".

HCA Marathon is named after the Danish Faity-tale writer Hans Christian Andersen.

HCA Marathon is the worlds fastest marathon in 2019. On average the runners finish the marathon in just 3:51:22 which is just 8 minutes 50 second a mile. HCA Marathon is also the marathon with the cleanest air in the world.

Course

The race is held on a round course, starting and finishing at Odense Idrætspark. The course is run twice, and the finish is in the athletics stadium.

Statistics

Course records

 Men: 2:10.37 Luka Chelimo (KEN), 2012
 Women: 2:30:48 Jerubet Perez (KEN), 2019

Winners

References

External links
 Official Site 
 H. C. Andersen Marathon on marathoninfo.free.fr

Marathons in Denmark
Sport in Odense
Recurring sporting events established in 2000
Hans Christian Andersen
Autumn events in Denmark
2000 establishments in Denmark